Luca Maestri (born 14 October 1963) is an Italian businessman. He is Apple Inc's chief financial officer.

Education 
Maestri has a Bachelor of Economics from LUISS University in Rome and Master of Science in Management from Boston University.

Career

Before Apple 

The first global company where Maestri worked was at General Motors. After that, in 2009, he worked at Nokia Networks and at Xerox as a CFO.

Apple 

In 2014, after working at Apple Inc. as vice president of Finance and corporate controller, he was appointed CFO of Apple Inc. Along with being the chief financial officer he will also assume the responsibility of principal accounting officer. Upon being appointed CFO, he was issued 6,337 restricted stock units (currently worth approximately $4 million). Maestri's official salary is $1 million but he is eligible for Apple's performance-based cash bonus program which increases his salary. In 2014, he took in a salary of $14 million and in 2015, he took in a salary of $25.3 million. Based on SEC filings, from 2018 to 2020, Maestri's average compensation was $26 million.

References 

Living people
Apple Inc. executives
Xerox people
General Motors executives
1963 births
Businesspeople from Rome
Italian corporate directors
Italian expatriates in the United States
Libera Università Internazionale degli Studi Sociali Guido Carli alumni
21st-century Italian businesspeople
Boston University School of Management alumni
Chief financial officers